The Parts of Lindsey are a traditional division of Lincolnshire, England, covering the northern part of the county.  The Isle of Axholme, which is on the west side of the River Trent, has normally formed part of it.  The district's name originated from the Kingdom of Lindsey of Anglo-Saxon times, whose territories were merged with that of Stamford to form Lincolnshire.

Local government
When the English shires were established, Lindsey became part of Lincolnshire.  It, and each of Kesteven and Holland, acquired the formal designation of Parts of Lincolnshire.  Thus it became the Parts of Lindsey.

Lindsey was itself divided into three ridings: the North, West and South Ridings, which in turn were divided into wapentakes.  The West Riding covered the western part, including Gainsborough, Scunthorpe and Spital.  The North Riding covered the north-east, including Barton upon Humber, Caistor, Cleethorpes, Brigg, Grimsby and Market Rasen.  The South Riding covered the rest, in the south-east, including Louth, Mablethorpe and Skegness.  The point at which the Ridings all touched was somewhere near Lissington.

Lindsey, like the other parts of Lincolnshire, had long had a separate county administration (Quarter Sessions).  In 1889, this division was followed in the establishment of the administrative county of Lincolnshire, Parts of Lindsey, which had an elected county council.  Lincoln and Grimsby were independent county boroughs.

Within the rest of Lindsey there were various urban districts and rural districts, established by the Local Government Act 1894.  The rural districts were Caistor, Gainsborough, Glanford Brigg, Grimsby, Horncastle, Isle of Axholme, Louth, Spilsby, Welton.  A rural district of Sibsey also existed until 1936, when it was merged into Spilsby.

The administrative county of Parts of Lindsey was abolished on 1 April 1974 as a result of the Local Government Act 1972. Its area was divided between two new non-metropolitan counties: the northern area of Lindsey was placed in Humberside while the remainder passed to Lincolnshire. In 1996 the unpopular decision was all but reversed, in that Lincolnshire status was reinstated for the areas that had become South Humberside,  however the Lindsey name was not.

Lindsey was divided between six non-metropolitan districts, as follows

Present authorities

In 1996 these Humberside districts were re-grouped into unitary authorities; units which performed the duties of both county and administrative district.  One is North Lincolnshire (centred on Scunthorpe). This comprises the former districts of Glanford and Scunthorpe, as well as the Isle of Axholme which formed the southern part of Boothferry district.  The second is North East Lincolnshire, comprising the former districts of Great Grimsby and Cleethorpes.

The two unitary authorities represent the most urbanised part of traditional Lincolnshire.

References

Further reading
Russell, Reginald Charles (1965). A History of Schools and Education in Lindsey, Lincolnshire: 1800–1902. Lindsey County Council Education Committee.
Russell, Rex C. (1994). A History of School Teachers in Lindsey, Lincolnshire, c. 1800–1902. Barton-upon-Humber: Workers Education Association, Barton-upon-Humber Branch.
Wickstead, Arthur (1978). Lincolnshire, Lindsey: The Story of a County Council, 1889–1974. Lincolnshire and Humberside Arts.

External links
Map of Lindsey on Wikishire

 
Geography of Lincolnshire
History of Lincolnshire
Local government in Lincolnshire
Administrative counties abolished in 1974

ru:Линдси (Линкольншир)